Karim Bannani (born 26 July 1998) is a Dutch footballer who plays as a left back for HSV Hoek in the Derde Divisie. He formerly played professionally for FC Dordrecht.

Career
Born in Terneuzen, Bannani played in the youth departments of Terneuzense Boys and JVOZ. He joined the PSV academy in 2012, and later became part of the second team, Jong PSV. In February 2018, he signed a two-and-a-half-year contract with FC Dordrecht.

On 7 January 2019, Bannani joined HSV Hoek after six months on free agent.

References

1998 births
Living people
Dutch footballers
Jong PSV players
FC Dordrecht players
Eerste Divisie players
Association football defenders
People from Terneuzen
Terneuzense Boys players
HSV Hoek players
Dutch people of Tunisian descent
Footballers from Zeeland